Banregio Grupo Financiero, S.A.B. de C.V., doing business as BanRegio (Banco Regional S.A.), is a Mexican regional bank headquartered in San Pedro Garza García, near Monterrey, Mexico. It offers services mainly for small and medium-sized companies, such as business loans, leasing, factoring and working capital loans.

BanRegio operates 156 branches in 44 cities in central and northern Mexico. It has 298 ATMs and more than 12,000 points of sale terminals. More than 80% of its revenues come from services from small and medium-sized companies. Its performing loan portfolio is US$4 billion, almost half of it is originated in Nuevo Leon.

Banregio Grupo Financiero was listed on the Mexican Stock Exchange on 2011 and is a constituent of the IPC, the main benchmark index of Mexican stocks. In 2015, Banregio has helped more than 60,000 small and medium-sized enterprises (SMEs) with the intention of guiding Banregio on a different path than traditional banking. The mission is not easy for banks since international organizations recommend banks to open more the key of credit to small businesses, but for the director Manuel Rivero Zambrano he considers that credit should not necessarily be the main business of banking. In 2020, The Banker named Banregio as the best bank in Mexico for its performance entering the ranking of the "1000 best banks in the world" through a publication with a 50th anniversary edition of The Banker listing the best banks for their performance.

References

External links

 Official site
 Corporate Blog 

1994 establishments in Mexico
Companies based in Monterrey
Banks of Mexico
Banks established in 1994
Companies based in Nuevo León
Companies listed on the Mexican Stock Exchange